Richard Roberts was an English footballer who played as a forward for Crewe Alexandra.

Career
Roberts was signed to Crewe Alexandra during World War II. He played two games as a guest at nearby Port Vale in August and September 1944.

Career statistics
Source:

References

English footballers
Association football forwards
Crewe Alexandra F.C. players
Port Vale F.C. wartime guest players
English Football League players
Year of birth missing